Events in the year 1822 in Norway.

Incumbents
Monarch: Charles III John

Events
 March 11 – A powerful sudden storm struck the western Norwegian coast killing about 300 men at sea.
 May 26 – 116 people die in the Grue Church fire. It's the biggest fire disaster in Norway's history.

Arts and literature

Births
27 April – Karl Hals, businessperson and politician (d.1898)
29 October – Thomas Johannessen Heftye, businessperson, politician and philanthropist (d.1886)

Full date unknown
Jacob Bøckmann Barth, forester (d.1892)
Jess Julius Engelstad, engineer and railroad administrator (d.1896)
Rasmus Tønder Nissen, politician (d.1882)
Olav Paulssøn, bailiff, writer and politician (d.1896)
Ole Peter Petersen, founder of Methodism in Norway and co-founder of Norwegian and Danish Methodism in the United States (d.1901)
Karl Andreas Larsen Vefring, politician

Deaths
16 February — Claus Pavels, bishop (b.1769)

Full date unknown
Mathias Hagerup, politician (b.1765)
Sara Oust, revivalist lay preacher (b.1778)

See also